Manuel Baldomero Ugarte (27 February 1875 – 2 December 1951) was an Argentinian writer and former leader of the Argentinian Socialist Party.  He served as ambassador to Mexico, Nicaragua ,and Cuba. He advocated for the unity of Hispanic America. He supported nationalist anti-imperialism and Hispanicism throughout the Americas and Europe.

Biography
Manuel Baldomero Ugarte was born in San José de Flores, now part of the city of Buenos Aires, on the 27th of February 1875. His father was Floro Ugarte, and his mother was Sabina Rivero. His only brother, Floro Melitón Ugarte, born nine years later than Manuel, was a music composer and director of the famous Colón Theatre in Buenos Aires. His public life began alongside Leopoldo Lugones, Roberto Payró, Alberto Gerchunoff , Manuel Gálvez, and José Ingenieros. He founded La revista literaria, which, among others, published the works of Rubén Darío and Ricardo Jaimes Freyre.

Rubén Darío, Miguel de Unamuno, Delmira Agustini, R. Blanco Fombona, Henri Barbusse, Manuel Gálvez, Haya de la Torre, José Vasconscelos, Blanca Luz Brum, and many others, can be considered his friends and correspondents.

Political career 
Manuel represented the Argentinian Socialist Party in various congresses of the Second International organization at the beginning of the 20th century. When he abandoned socialism, he became a fervent neutralist during World War I.

General Perón named him ambassador to Mexico in 1946. He later served as ambassador to Nicaragua and Cuba. These nominations, which came close to his death, were the only recognition he received in his country.

Death 
He lived for many years in Paris and Nice in France, and Valparaíso, Chile. He died in Nice in 1951.

During his life, he visited every single capital city of Latin America to "get to know the region he has committed his life to defend better." He gave speeches in every country of Ibero-America and in some cities of the United States, Spain, and France.

Honors 
A street in the Belgrano neighborhood of Buenos Aires is named after him.

Publications
Among his published books are:

 El porvenir de América Latina
 Vendimias juveniles
 El destino de un continente
 Cuentos de la Pampa
 El dolor de escribir
 El dramático destino de una generación
 El naufragio de los Argonautas

References

External links

Argentine male writers
Argentine people of Basque descent
1875 births
1951 deaths
Burials at La Recoleta Cemetery